Clancy Quay is a residential development of houses and apartments in Islandbridge, Dublin, Ireland. The development and surrounds originally housed an artillery barracks, known as Islandbridge Barracks and later Clancy Barracks, before closing in 1998. 

The Clancy Quay development includes protected structures from the original barracks converted into residences, as well as new apartment buildings. In 2021 it was the largest private rental complex in Ireland with over 845 units.

Barracks
The Islandbridge Barracks was established in 1798. Samuel Lewis' Topological Dictionary of Ireland in 1837 described it as follows:

The British Army left the Islandbridge Barracks on 14 December 1922, following the establishment of the Irish Free State, and the barracks was handed over to the Irish Army.

It was renamed Clancy Barracks after Peadar Clancy in 1942.

Redevelopment

The Irish Army closed Clancy Barracks in 1998, and the State sold the premises to David Kennedy's Florence Properties in 2002. The redevelopment plan was approved in 2006. In this time period, the former barracks also functioned as a major counting centre for the Pennies from Heaven appeal, which asked people across Ireland to donate old and foreign coinage, which was then sorted by volunteers.  Over 7 million euro was donated, benefiting 11 charities.  Over 120,000 euro was stolen in a raid, but partly recovered thereafter.

Kennedy lost the project during the Celtic Tiger bust, with the partially-completed development eventually being acquired by US-based Kennedy Wilson and Axa Investment Managers in 2013. The third and final phase of construction was completed in 2020.

Popular culture
The area was a popular filming location until redevelopment, including the film Lassie (released 2005) and TV series' Ripper Street and Quirke (filming in 2012–2013).

References

Further reading

Buildings and structures in Dublin (city)
Barracks in the Republic of Ireland
Apartment buildings in the Republic of Ireland